Justice Metcalf may refer to:

Lee Metcalf, associate justice of the Montana Supreme Court
Theron Metcalf, associate justice of the Massachusetts Supreme Judicial Court